Kristy Odamura (born October 3, 1977 in Vancouver, British Columbia) is a Canadian softball second baseman. She began playing softball at age eight. She is a graduate of the University of Hawaii-Hilo. She was a part of the Canadian Softball team that finished 8th at the 2000 Summer Olympics and part of the Canadian Softball team that finished 5th at the 2004 Summer Olympics.

References
Editing Kristy Odamura on Real Champions
sports-reference

1977 births
Canadian softball players
Canadian sportspeople of Japanese descent
Living people
Olympic softball players of Canada
Softball players at the 2000 Summer Olympics
Softball players at the 2004 Summer Olympics
Sportspeople from Vancouver
University of Hawaiʻi at Hilo alumni